Caroline Faye Diop (born 11 July 1923 at Foundiougne, died 28 July 1992 at Dakar) was a Senegalese politician. She was elected the first female deputy to the National Assembly of Senegal in 1963 and was later (1978) a cabinet minister under President Abdou Diouf. She was married to Demba Diop, the  Minister of Youth and Sport under president Léopold Sédar Senghor. Her father (Diène Faye) was a Serer of Joal.

See also
Louis Diène Faye

References

1923 births
1992 deaths
Members of the National Assembly (Senegal)
Government ministers of Senegal
Women government ministers of Senegal
Socialist Party of Senegal politicians
Serer politicians
Caroline
20th-century women politicians
20th-century Senegalese women politicians
20th-century Senegalese politicians